This is a timeline of the Walt Disney Company, listing notable milestones for the Walt Disney Company.

20th century

1923–1950

1951–1975

1976–2000

21st century (2001–present)

See also

 Disney Renaissance
 List of Disney theatrical animated feature films
 List of Disney live-action adaptations and remakes of Disney animated films
 List of Walt Disney Pictures films

References

Bibliography

 

History of The Walt Disney Company
Business timelines
Walt Disney Company